Philip Graham (born August 26, 1951) is an American author, professor, and editor.  He is one of the founders, and the current editor-at-large, of the literary/arts journal, Ninth Letter, which won the MLA’s Best New Literary Journal Award in 2005.  He is a professor emeritus in the Creative Writing Program at the University of Illinois at Urbana-Champaign, where he received three campus-wide teaching awards.  He has also taught in the low-residency MFA program of the Vermont College of Fine Arts.  Additionally, he is the recipient of a National Endowment for the Arts Creative Writing Fellowship, a grant from the National Endowment for the Humanities, two Illinois Arts Council grants, and the William Peden Prize in Fiction from The Missouri Review, as well as fellowship residencies at the MacDowell Colony and Yaddo artists' colony.

Graham was born in Brooklyn, New York City on August 26, 1951. He received a B.A. from Sarah Lawrence College in 1973, where he studied with Grace Paley, and received an M.A. from City College/City University of New York in 1976, where he studied with Donald Barthelme and Frederic Tuten.

Writing
Graham is the author of seven books:

The Vanishings (Release Press, 1978).  Prose poems from the book first appeared in The Paris Review, Virginia Quarterly Review, Poetry Now, and elsewhere.  Listed by Library Journal as one of the Best Small Press Publications of 1978.
The Art of the Knock: Stories (William Morrow and Company, 1985; Dzanc Books, 2014).  Short stories from this book first appeared in The New Yorker, The Washington Post Magazine, Carolina Quarterly, and Chicago Review, and subsequently appeared in the anthologies The Norton Book of Ghost Stories, edited by Brad Leithauser, and Contemporary American Short Stories (Germany), and were reprinted and/or translated in India and the Netherlands.  The Art of the Knock was listed as one of the Best New Works of Fiction for 1985 by the San Francisco Chronicle.
Parallel Worlds: An Anthropologist and a Writer Encounter Africa, co-authored with Alma Gottlieb (Crown Publishing Group/Random House, 1993).  Excerpts from this memoir originally appeared in Poets & Writers Magazine, Writer’s Digest, and The Cream City Review.  Winner of the 1993 Victor Turner Prize, Parallel Worlds has been taught internationally in over 200 colleges and universities.
How to Read an Unwritten Language (Scribner, 1995; Dzanc Books, 2014), a novel.  Nominated for the 1997 International Dublin Literary Award, and listed by the 1996 Magill’s Literary Annual as one of the 200 Outstanding Books of 1995, the novel also appeared on the Wordstock Bestseller list.  An excerpt from the novel appeared in Things (U.K.).  The paperback edition (Warner Books, 1996) was listed as a "New and Noteworthy” paperback by The New York Times Book Review.
Interior Design: Stories (Scribner, 1996; Dzanc Books, 2014).  Short stories from the collection originally appeared in Missouri Review, Fiction, The North American Review and Mid-American Review, among others.  The short story “Angel” was the winner of the 1992 William Peden Prize in Fiction from The Missouri Review, and was anthologized in The Year’s Best Fantasy and Horror, Tenth Annual Collection; the short story “Interior Design” is anthologized in Turning Life into Fiction, 2nd edition, by Robin Hemley.
The Moon Come to Earth: Dispatches from Lisbon (University of Chicago Press, 2009).  A travel memoir about a year spent living in Lisbon with his family, Graham's book collects and expands dispatches that originally appeared on the website of the literary magazine, McSweeneys.
Braided Worlds, a sequel to Parallel Worlds, co-authored with Alma Gottlieb (University of Chicago Press, 2012).  Excerpts from this memoir originally appeared in McSweeney's Internet Tendency; The Moon, Come to Earth: Dispatches from Lisbon; Mid-American Review; Being There: Learning to Live Cross-Culturally (edited by Melvin Konner and Sarah Davis); Anthropology and Humanism; and Bridges to Friendship (edited by Bruce Grindal and Frank Salamone).

Graham’s non-fiction has appeared in The New York Times, Chicago Tribune, The Washington Post, Things (U.K.), and In the Middle of the Middle West: Literary Nonfiction from the Heartland (edited by Becky Bradway).  His dispatches from Lisbon appeared regularly on the website of McSweeney’s.  He has written over 30 book reviews on contemporary fiction and non-fiction for the Chicago Tribune and The New Leader.  His essays on the craft of writing have appeared in Rules of Thumb: 73 Authors Reveal Their Fiction Writing Fixations (edited by Michael Martone and Susan Neville), Words Overflown by Stars (edited by David Jauss), Now Write! Nonfiction Writing Exercises from Today’s Best Writers and Teachers (edited by Sherry Ellis), and The Field Guide to Writing Flash Nonfiction, edited by Dinty W. Moore.

Forthcoming work
Graham is completing a novel, Invisible Country.  Chapter excerpts from this novel have appeared in recent years in Crab Orchard Review, Western Humanities Review, Hunger Mountain, Gargoyle Magazine, River Styx Magazine, and F Magazine.

External links
 Personal Website
 An excerpt from The Moon, Come to Earth

References 
 

American male writers
1951 births
Living people